Kalinov Most (Калинов мост, "guelder-rose bridge") is a Russian folk rock band, one of the most popular bands in Russia.

The band was formed in 1984 by vocalist and songwriter Dmitry Revyakin in Novosibirsk, Siberia, USSR. They are widely considered to be the first Russian folk rock band.

Their music and lyrics are deeply influenced by Russian folk music and Slavic mythology. The name "Kalinov Most" itself refers to a bridge between the world of the living and the world of the dead in Russian heroic tales and legends. Since frontman Dmitry Revyakin became a born again Christian in 2000, emphasis shifted from Paganism to Christian themes.

Kalinov Most prefers to play their own compositions rather than original folk songs.

Discography

Studio albums
 1986 — Калинов мост (Kalinov most / )
 1990 — Выворотень (Vivoroten')
 1991 — Узарень (Uzaren')
 1991 — Дарза (Darza)
 1993 — Пояс Ульчи (Poyas Ul'chi)
 1998 — Оружие (Oruzhiye / The Weapon)
 2001 — Руда (Ruda / Ore)
 2006 — SWA
 2007 — Ледяной поход (Ledyanoy pohod / Ice Campaign)
 2009 — Сердце (Serdce / Heart)
 2010 — Эсхато (Eshato / Eschato)
 2012 — Золотое толокно (Zolotoye tolokno / Golden flour)

Live albums
 1987 — Надо было (Live)(Nado bylo / It Was Necessary)
 1988 — Вольница (Live)(Vol'nitsa / Free Rein)
 1991 — Мелодии голых ветвей (Live) (Melodii golyh vetvey / Melodies of Naked Branches)
 1993 — Никак 406 (Live)(Nikak 406 / nowise)
 1994 — Покориться весне (Live)(Pokoritsya vesnye / To Obey Spring)
 1997 — Живая коллекция (Live)(Zhivaya kollektsiya / Alive Collection)
 1999 — Катунь (Live)(Katun' / Katun)

Other releases
 1988 — Всякие разные песни (D.Revyakin solo)(Vsyakiye raznye pesni / Any Different Songs)
 1988 — Обломилась доска (D.Revyakin solo)(Oblomilas' doska / The Board Has Broken Off)
 1988 — Охта (Д. Ревякин соло) (Ohta / Okhta)
 1992 — Ливень (Liven' / Downpour)
 1994 — Быль (Byl' / True Story)
 1995 — Травень (Traven' / May)
 1996 — Всё поле в цветах (D.Revyakin solo)(Vsyo pole v tsvetah / All Field in Flowers)
 1998 — Обряд (D.Revyakin solo)(Obryad / Ceremony)
 1999 — Улетай (Uletay / Fly Away)
 2000 — Иерусалим (макси-сингл)(Ierusalim / Jerusalem)

External links

 Official Site (Russian)
 About the band on another web site (Russian)
 Not official web-site (Russian)

Russian rock music groups
Russian folk musicians
Musical groups from Novosibirsk
Soviet rock music groups